Nam Da-reum (born June 13, 2002) is a South Korean actor. He began his career as a child actor, having played young versions of the leading characters in several popular Korean dramas, and best known for his lead role in Beautiful World (2019).

His other roles of portraying child and teen versions includes: Boys Over Flowers (2009), Pinocchio (2014), Guardian: The Lonely and Great God (2016), Rain or Shine (2017), The King in Love (2017), While You Were Sleeping (2017), Come and Hug Me (2018), Radio Romance (2018),  Start-up (2020), and Doom at Your Service (2021).

Personal life 
Nam enlisted in the mandatory military service on February 8, 2022, when he was 21 years old in Korean age.

Filmography

Films

Television series

Web series

Music videos

Awards and nominations

References

External links
 
 
 

2002 births
Living people
People from Gyeonggi Province
South Korean male child actors
South Korean male television actors
South Korean male film actors
South Korean male web series actors